The Beihai Tunnel is a tunnel in Dongyin Township, Lienchiang County, Taiwan.

History
The construction of the tunnel started in 1968 by the armed forces and completed in 1970. It was constructed by hands and dynamites. In February 2001, the tunnel was handed over from the military to Matsu National Scenic Area Administration in was then later renovated by the administration. It was then opened to the public in August 2001.

Architecture
The tunnel spans over 193 meters long, 10 meters wide and 12 meters high. At the end of the tunnel, there are status of eight workers who perished during the construction.

See also
 Beihai Tunnel (Beigan)
 Beihai Tunnel (Nangan)

References

1970 establishments in Taiwan
Dongyin Township
Military history of Taiwan
Tunnels completed in 1970
Tunnels in Lienchiang County
Tunnel warfare